The Montol Festival (often just Montol) is an annual festival in Penzance, Cornwall, United Kingdom, which has been held on 21 December each year since 2007. The festival is a revival or reinterpretation of many of the traditional Cornish midwinter customs & Christmas traditions formerly practiced in and around the Penzance area and common to much of Cornwall at one point. The festival spans several days, but the main events are held on the traditional date of the feast of St Thomas the Apostle, usually 21 December, which always coincides with the winter solstice.

Origin and history
Montol came about from the same community which had created Golowan, a midsummer festival also held in Penzance, though different people were involved. The idea was formed after the success of Golowan, in order to celebrate the winter solstice in a similar manner. Montol sought to revive practices recorded by antiquarians, some of which reportedly only died out after the Second World War. The first festival was in 2007 and was initially funded by grants from central government.

The festival was cancelled in 2020 due to the COVID-19 pandemic.

Name origin
Edward Lhuyd, in his 1700 MSS of vocabulary in the Cornish language, states that Montol means 'winter solstice'. However, he later translates the word as 'balance' (in Latin, Trutina – 'a set of scales').

Revived customs 

Montol is not based on a particular historical festival, but rather incorporates many different recorded customs.

The festival centres around Montol Eve (21 December) and several revived traditions of West Cornwall including, most predominantly, guise dancing. Guise dancing is a Cornish custom in which people dress up in costumes and masks and play music, dance, sing and take part in parades, somewhat similar to mummering elsewhere in England. During the evening large guiser processions can be seen through the town, carrying lanterns, wearing masks and traditional costumes. Early in the evening a Lord of Misrule is chosen from among the masked revellers by the drawing of coloured beans. The Lord of Misrule leads the main processions and has certain honorary functions, although there is no historical basis for this part of the event prior to 2007.

Since 2010, Pen Hood (the Montol Obby Oss) and Penglaz (the Golowan Obby Oss) appear later on, leading parades and revelling, with the evening culminating in the ceremony of the "Chalking of the Mock". The Mock is a Cornish Yule Log, which is marked with a stick figure and then burnt on the Montol bonfire. In the early years of the festival, the bonfire was a beacon was lit at Lescudjack Hill Fort, in a similar vein to the beacons lit by the Old Cornwall Society at midsummer. More recently, the bonfire has been held at the Princess May Recreation Ground, opposite Humphry Davy School.

Other customs include the Cornish candle dance (a dance around a basket full of lit, brightly-coloured candles), and the performance of traditional Guisers plays such as St George and the Turkish Knight or Buffy and the Bucca. Cornish Christmas carols also feature during the festivities.

Historical basis
The historical basis for many of the customs described above is taken from the texts of notable Cornish antiquarians and contemporary research into the subject. A. K. Hamilton Jenkin in his book Cornish Homes and Customs describes the Guise dance processions and performances of 1831 as "like an Italian carnival" and further noted that "everyone including the rich and the great came masked and disguised on to the streets".

A detailed description of the Penzance Guise dancers is given by William Bottrell in his book Traditions and Hearthside Stories of West Cornwall (1870–80):

Community events 
The festival often includes community-oriented events such as public music, a series of workshops dedicated to the making of masks and costumes so people can join in with guise parades, community carol services, and a ceilidh.

See also  

Golowan Festival
Tom Bawcock's Eve
Mari Lwyd

External links  
Official website for the Montol Festival
Amateur footage of the Montol Festival
Origin of the word Montol from the Teer Ha Tavaz website (archived version)
Rivers of Fire at the Montol Festival in Penzance (Eyewitness account of the celebration)

References 

Cornish culture
Festivals in Cornwall
December events
Ritual animal disguise
Penzance
Cornish festivals
Winter festivals in the United Kingdom
2007 establishments in England
Recurring events established in 2007
Festivals established in 2007